In linguistics, a proparoxytone is a word with stress on the antepenultimate (third last) syllable, such as the English words "cinema" and "operational". Related concepts are paroxytone (stress on the penultimate syllable) and oxytone (stress on the last syllable).

In English, most nouns of three or more syllables are proparoxytones, except in words ending in –tion or –sion, which tend to be paroxytones (operation, equivocation). This tendency is so strong in English that it frequently leads to the stress on derived words being on different part of the root. For example, the root photograph gives rise to the nouns photography and photographer, family → familiar and familial. (In many dialects of English, the i in family is even deleted entirely, and still has the stress in familial and familiar.)

In medieval Latin lyric poetry, a proparoxytonic line or half-line is one where the antepenultimate syllable is stressed, as in the first half of the verse "Estuans intrinsecus || ira vehementi."

Mentions in literature 
Ernst Robert Curtius offers an interesting use of the term in a footnote (Ch. 8, n. 33) of his European Literature in the Latin Middle Ages. He is commenting on this passage from Smaragdus of Saint-Mihiel's didactic poem on grammar:

 
 

Here is Curtius' note:
Sad is the lot of the interjection, for of all the parts of speech it has the lowest place. There is none to praise it." On the way from Latin to French, the penultimate syllable of the proparoxytone succumbed. Mallarmé was so touched by this that he wrote a prose poem on the "Death of the Penultimate" ( in ). It ends:  (Eerie, I flee: likely some (no-)one doomed to wear weeds for the explainable second-last.)

See also 
 Barytone
 Oxytone
 Paroxytone
 Penult
 Perispomenon
 Properispomenon
 Stress (linguistics)

Phonology
Ancient Greek
Stress (linguistics)